Sadisfaction is the debut album by Gregorian. Two singles were released from the album: "So Sad" and "Once in a Lifetime", with "So Sad" reaching number one in Portugal.

Originally, Gregorian was conceived as a more pop-oriented group in the vein of Enigma. Under this concept, Frank Peterson together with Matthias Meissner and Thomas Schwarz recorded this album, with lead vocals provided by The Sisters of Oz: Susana Espelleta (Peterson's wife at the time) and Birgit Freud. However, this was the only album by the trio in that style. The project was revived by Peterson in 1998 with new members, releasing the Masters of Chant series of albums in the Gregorian chant style.

Track listing 
 "Watcha Gonna Do" (F. Gregorian, Wehr) – 4:04
 "Once in a Lifetime" (F. Gregorian, Schwarz, Meissner) – 4:09 
 "So Sad" (F. Gregorian) – 3:36 
 "Forever" (F. Gregorian, Wehr, Hagel) – 3:08
 "The Quiet Self" (F. Gregorian) – 5:29
 "Reflect" (F. Gregorian) – 2:53
 "Monastry" (F. Gregorian) – 3:19
 "Gonna Make You Mine" (Shwarz, F. Gregorian, Meissner) – 3:16
 "You Take My Breath Away" (F. Gregorian) – 4:26
 "I Love You" (Schwarz, F. Gregorian, Meissner) – 3:29
 "Why Did You Go (I Feel Sad)" (Wehr, Hagel) – 3:45
 "The Mission" (Wehr) – 3:15
 "Depressions" (F. Gregorian) – 2:59

References

1991 debut albums
Gregorian (band) albums
Albums produced by Frank Peterson